Little Foxes is a book written by Michael Morpurgo in 1984

Plot
Billy Bunch is an orphan who has had many foster families which never worked out. He is currently living with a foster mother in the suburbs of a city. They don't get on well. At school Billy is not good at subjects, especially English (he cannot read out loud because he stutters). One night, while Billy tries to run away, he runs into the nearby abandoned land where there are the ruins of a monastery. There is plentiful wildlife living in this place that others call "The Waste Ground". Billy calls it his "Wilderness."  Billy connects with the nature and wildlife there, rescuing an injured swan and nurturing some fox cubs, finding solace in the process.

Aided by the comfort he finds in his new animal friends in his Wilderness, Billy is able to outgrow his stutter.  He remains in his foster home and continues to visit his friends in Wilderness for a while. This does not last long before others in his neighborhood begin to view the area as a danger and the wildlife within it as a threat.  Events take some unfortunate turns, and eventually Billy runs away with one of the young foxes.  The two of them have several adventures and develop a strong bond.  On one of these adventures, he meets a man who has a boat and cares for all the birds around the river. The man says that Billy can stay with him on his boat as they are going in the same direction.  For the first time in his life, Billy has somebody who allows him to be himself while also helping him understand some hard truths about life.  The journey down the river on the boat begins a journey into young adulthood for both Billy and his beloved fox.

1984 British novels
1984 children's books
British children's novels
Novels by Michael Morpurgo
Books about foxes
Novels about orphans
Children's novels about animals